The tenth series of the British semi-reality television programme The Only Way Is Essex was confirmed on 10 July 2013 by cast member Bobby-Cole Norris on Twitter. The series began on 6 October 2013 with two The Only Way Is Vegas specials and was followed by a regular run of the series from 13 October 2013 until 13 November 2013. This was the last series to feature Joey Essex, with him making his final appearance in the series finale, and Lucy Mecklenburgh after she departed the series during the Christmas special at the end of the series. This series also marked the arrival of new cast member Elliott Wright, cousin of Mark and Jess Wright.

Cast

Episodes

{| class="wikitable plainrowheaders" style="width:100%; background:#fff;"
|-style="color:white"
! style="background:#D0A9F5;"| Seriesno.
! style="background:#D0A9F5;"| Episodeno.
! style="background:#D0A9F5;"| Title
! style="background:#D0A9F5;" | Original Airdate
! style="background:#D0A9F5;"| Duration
! style="background:#D0A9F5;"| UK viewers

|}

Reception

Ratings

References

The Only Way Is Essex
2013 in British television
2013 British television seasons